Goober and the Ghost Chasers is an animated television series produced by Hanna-Barbera Productions, broadcast on ABC from September 8, 1973, to August 30, 1975. A total of 16 half-hour episodes of Goober and the Ghost Chasers were produced. The show's episodes were later serialized as part of the syndicated weekday series Fred Flintstone and Friends in 1977–78. On cable, it was shown as part of USA Cartoon Express and on Boomerang starting in 2000.

Like many animated television programs created by Hanna-Barbera in the 1970s, the show contained a laugh track created by the studio. Cartoon Network and Boomerang airings of the show have the track muted.

Goober and the Ghost Chasers are shown on a list in the Velma episode "Velma Makes a List".

Plot
Similar to Hanna-Barbera's successful Scooby-Doo, Where Are You!, Goober and the Ghost Chasers also features a group of teenagers (Ted, Gilly and Tina) solving spooky mysteries with their Saluki Goober. Writing for Ghost Chasers Magazine, the group uses their equipment from the Apparition Kit (like the Specter Detector, the Poltergeist Powder, etc.) when it comes to determining whether the ghost is real or not. The major differences were that the ghosts they eventually find are real and would help in defeating the fake ghosts. Some of those people behind the mask of some fake ghosts are not criminals. Goober had the power to become invisible (but could not control it) and his closest human companion is reckless instead of cowardly. Also unlike Scooby-Doo, Goober can speak more clearly, but speaks only to "break the fourth wall" with a comment aimed at the viewers; otherwise, he merely barks.

In eight of the first 11 episodes, the Partridge Kids (from The Partridge Family) were regular members of the cast, with their live-action counterparts voicing the parts. They disappear after the eleventh episode and did not appear when other guest stars appeared.

Cast
 Jerry Dexter as Ted
 Jo Ann Harris as Tina
 Ronnie Schell as Gilly
 Paul Winchell as Goober

Additional
 Danny Bonaduce as Danny Partridge
 Suzanne Crough as Tracy Partridge
 Susan Dey as Laurie Partridge
 Brian Forster as Chris Partridge
 Wilt Chamberlain as himself
 Michael Gray as himself

Episodes

Merchandising
In 1974, King Seeley released a metal lunchbox and thermos featuring Goober, which shared space with another Hanna-Barbera series, Inch High, Private Eye.

Goober was featured in a magic trading card set that was offered free inside Wonder Bread packages in 1974.

Home media
In 1986 and 1988, two videocassette editions of the series were released.  Goober and the Ghost Chasers, a 45-minute cassette containing the first two episodes guest-starring The Partridge Kids ("Brush Up Your Shakespeare" and "Assignment: The Ahab Apparition"), was released by Worldvision Home Video on October 21, 1986, and Goober and the Ghost Chasers: The Chase Is On!, an 81-minute cassette containing four episodes ("The Singing Ghost", "Aloha Ghost", "Mummy Knows Best" and "The Haunted Wax Museum"), was released by Hanna-Barbera Home Video on September 29, 1988.

The Goober and the Ghost Chasers''' premiere episode, "Assignment: The Ahab Apparition", was included on the DVD compilation Saturday Morning Cartoons: 1970s – Volume 1 released by Warner Home Video on May 26, 2009.

On October 26, 2010, Warner Archive released Goober and the Ghost Chasers: The Complete Series on DVD in region 1 as part of their Hanna–Barbera Classics Collection.  This is a Manufacture-on-Demand (MOD) release, available exclusively through Warner's online store and Amazon.com.

References

External links
 Goober and the Ghost Chasers'' at CMonGetHappy.com
 

1970s American animated television series
1973 American television series debuts
1975 American television series endings
American Broadcasting Company original programming
American animated television spin-offs
American children's animated comedy television series
American children's animated fantasy television series
American children's animated mystery television series
American children's animated horror television series
Television series by Hanna-Barbera
Hanna-Barbera characters
Animated television series about dogs
Animated television series about ghosts
Fictional characters who can turn invisible
English-language television shows
Fiction about invisibility
The Partridge Family
Comedy franchises
Teen animated television series